Gabriel Graciani may refer to:

 Gabriel Graciani (footballer, born 1982), Argentine defender for Patronato
 Gabriel Graciani (footballer, born 1993), Argentine defender for San Martín